Edwin Fisher may refer to:

 Edwin Fisher (banker) (1883–1947), English banker, chairman of Barclay's Bank
 Eddie Fisher (singer) (Edwin John Fisher; 1928–2010), American singer
 Ed Fisher (American football) (Edwin Louis Fisher; born 1949), American football player

See also
Edmund Fisher (disambiguation)
Edward Fisher (disambiguation)